Maharaja's College, Mysore (1889) is a college affiliated to Mysore University.

History
The college finds its origins in the English-school known as "Maharaja Patashala"  established by Maharaja of Mysore, Krishnaraja Wadiyar III  in 1833, at the request of a British officer, General Fraser. Subsequently, it became a High School, and in 1868, after the death of Maharaja was handed over to the Government of Mysore. The foundation stone of the present building was laid by Prince Albert Victor of Wales during his tour of India on 27 November 1889 in Mysore, during the reign Chamarajendra Wadiyar X.  In 1879, the college was upgraded and became affiliated with University of Madras, it was upgraded to the first grade college in 1894.

The building was constructed at a cost of Rs 9.41 lakh at the time, The architecture was highlighted by arcaded verandahs on two floors, a central mansard roof and projecting end-blocks. It alsoemployed ornate elements like impost mouldings and pilastered capitals. Nearly four decades later, the building of Yuvaraja's College, constructed near by in 1927 was modelled on the Maharaja's college building.

The college took its present shape when the University of Mysore was established in 1916. The university started functioning from college campus itself and VC's office remained here till 1947 when Crawford Hall was built. M.A. courses were started at the college in 1917. It went on to be a pioneer in the education. The college has had distinguished teachers such as Prof. JC Rollo, Albert Mackintosh, Kuvempu, Shama Rao, K. Hanumanta Rao, and Dr. Sarvepalli Radhakrishnan (1918-1921) besides notable alumni like writer R.K. Narayan.

As of July 2013, the University of Mysore was accredited "Grade A" by National Assessment and Accreditation Council (NAAC), while its academic staff was ranked amongst the top 5 in across India.

Former faculty

 Cattamanchi Ramalinga Reddy
 N. S. Subba Rao
 Sarvepalli Radhakrishnan.
 S. Srikanta Sastri historian, Indologist, and polyglot 
 K. V. Puttappa (Kuvempu)
 T. S. Venkannayya
 M. Hiriyanna, Professor of Sanskrit, Philosophy and Aesthetics
 M. N. Srinivas, sociologist
 S. R. Rao, archaeologist
 M. H. Krishna, Historian and Archaeologist
 Ralapalli Anantha Krishna Sharma, Telugu and Sanskrit scholar and musicologist
 C. D. Narasimhaiah, Writer and literary critic, former Principal and Padma Bhushan awardee
 V. Seetharamaiah

Academics

Courses
 M.Sc. in Geographical Information System
 M.Sc. in Criminology and Forensic Science
 M.A. in Political Science
 M.A. in International Relations
 B.A. in ancient history and archeology and museology
 B.A. in sociology
 B.A. in criminology
 B.A. in public administration
 B.A. in economics
 B.A. in geography
 B.A. in political science
 B.A. in psychology
 B.A. in journalism

Notable alumni
 H. Narayan Murthy 
 S. M. Krishna
 R. K. Laxman 
 M. V. Seetharamiah 
 V. Seetharamaiah
 S. Srikanta Sastri
 D. L. Narasimhachar
 R. K. Narayan
 A. R. Krishnashastry
 Kuvempu
 S L Bhyrappa
 Venkataramiah Sitaramiah 
 G. S. Shivarudrappa
 H. Y. Sharada Prasad, writer,  media adviser to Prime Minister Indira Gandhi
 P. Lankesh
 Govindray H. Nayak
 Poornachandra Tejaswi
 T. N. Srikantaiah 
 T. S. Shama Rao
 M. Rajashekharamurthy, Union Minister of State for Planning
 Triveni, Kannada novelist
 Aryamba Pattabhi, Kannada novelist
 Chaduranga, Kannada novelist
 B. Prasanna Kumar, politician
 S.V. Setty, first Indian aviator

Image gallery

See also
 Krishnaraja Boulevard
 Oriental Library
 Chamarajapuram railway station
 Ballal Circle
 Crawford Hall

References

External links

 Maharaja's College, Mysore, Official website

Universities and colleges in Mysore
Kingdom of Mysore
University of Mysore
Colleges affiliated to University of Mysore
Academic institutions formerly affiliated with the University of Madras
Educational institutions established in 1889
1889 establishments in India